Eric Daniel Pierre Cantona (born 24 May 1966) is a French actor, director, producer, and former professional footballer. Often regarded as one of the greatest players of his generation, Cantona is credited with having played a leading role in making Manchester United the dominant force in English football in the 1990s, and has legendary status at the club. In 2004, he was named by Pelé in the FIFA 100 list of the world's greatest living players.

A large, physically strong, hard-working, and tenacious player, Cantona combined technical skill and creativity with power and goalscoring ability. Widely occupied as a deep-lying forward, he was also capable of playing as a centre-forward, as an out-and-out striker, as an attacking midfielder, or as a central midfielder on occasion.
Cantona played for Auxerre, Martigues, Marseille, Bordeaux, Montpellier, Nîmes, and Leeds United before ending his career at Manchester United, where he won four Premier League titles in five years and two League and FA Cup Doubles. He wore the iconic No. 7 shirt at Manchester United, and was known for turning up his collar – a trademark look. He is also affectionately nicknamed by Manchester United fans as "King Eric". Cantona won the league championship in seven of his last eight full seasons as a professional. At international level, he played for the France national team and scored 20 goals in 45 matches. He appeared at UEFA Euro 1992 and, in preparation for Euro 96, was appointed the nation's captain until a football suspension which resulted from an incident in January 1995.  

In 2003, Cantona was voted as Manchester United's greatest ever player by Inside United magazine. He was an inaugural inductee into the English Football Hall of Fame in 2002. The museum states that "the enigmatic Frenchman was one of the Premier League's most controversial players ever". At the Premier League 10 Seasons Awards in 2003, he was voted the Overseas Player of the Decade. Cantona was inducted into the Premier League Hall of Fame in 2021. Charismatic and outspoken, set against Cantona's achievements in football was a poor disciplinary record throughout his career, including a 1995 conviction for the January 1995 incident – an assault on an abusive spectator – for which he received a two-week prison sentence (reduced to community service on appeal) and an eight-month suspension from football.

In 1997, Cantona unexpectedly announced his retirement from football at the age of 30. He pursued a career in cinema and had roles in the 1998 film Elizabeth, starring Cate Blanchett; the 2008 film French Film, and the 2009 film Looking for Eric. In 2010, he debuted as a stage actor in Face au Paradis, a play directed by his wife, Rachida Brakni. Cantona took an interest in the sport of beach soccer; as player-manager of the France national team, he won the 2005 FIFA Beach Soccer World Cup.

Early life
Cantona was born in Marseille on 24 May 1966, the son of dressmaker Éléonore Raurich, and nurse and painter Albert Cantona. His mother was Spanish and came from Barcelona, while his paternal grandfather was Italian and had emigrated to Marseille from Sardinia. While fighting the armies of General Franco in the Spanish Civil War in 1938, Cantona's maternal grandfather, Pere Raurich, suffered a serious injury to his liver and had to retreat to France for medical treatment with his wife; they stayed in Saint-Priest, Ardèche, before settling in Marseille. The Cantona family home was a cave in one of the hills in the Les Caillols area of Marseille, between the city's 11th and 12th arrondissements, and it was rumoured to have been used as a lookout post for the Wehrmacht towards the end of the Second World War. The site was chosen in the mid-1950s by Cantona's paternal grandmother, whose husband was a stonemason. By the time Cantona was born in 1966, the hillside cave had become little more than a room in the family's house, which was now up to a habitable standard. Cantona has two brothers: Jean-Marie, who is four years older, and Joël, who is 17 months younger.

Club career

Early career
Cantona began his football career with SO Caillolais, his local team and one that had produced such talent as Roger Jouve and had players such as Jean Tigana and Christophe Galtier within its ranks. Originally, Cantona began to follow in his father's footsteps and often played as a goalkeeper, but his creative instincts began to take over and he would play up front more and more often. In his time with SO Caillolais, Cantona played in more than 200 matches.

Auxerre
Cantona's first professional club was Auxerre, where he spent two years in the youth team before making his debut on 5 November 1983, in a 4–0 league victory over Nancy. In 1984 his footballing career was put on hold as he carried out his national service. On 14 May 1985, Cantona scored his first goal for Auxerre, scoring an open goal to put his team 2–0 up against Rouen in an important match to put pressure on AS Monaco. On the final matchday of the season, Auxerre played Strasbourg, with Auxerre needing one point to secure qualification for the following seasons' UEFA Cup; 1–0 down at half-time, Cantona scored the equalising goal from 25 yards out and showed his talent to a wider audience for the first time. After his discharge he was loaned out to Martigues in the French Second Division before rejoining Auxerre and signing a professional contract in 1986. His performances in the First Division earned him his first full international cap.

The following year, Cantona was again in trouble because of a dangerous kung-fu tackle on Nantes player Michel Der Zakarian, resulting in a three-month suspension, this was later reduced to a two-month suspension as his club Auxerre threatened to make the player unavailable for selection in the national team. He was part of the France under-21 side that won the 1988 U21 European Championship, scoring a hat-trick in a quarter-final against the England under-21 side, and shortly after he transferred to Marseille for a French record fee (FF22m). Cantona had grown up as a Marseille fan.

Marseille 
In January 1989 during a friendly game against Torpedo Moscow he kicked the ball at the crowd, then ripped off and threw away his shirt after being substituted. His club responded by banning him for a month. Just a few months earlier, he had been banned from international matches for one year after insulting the national coach Henri Michel on TV.

Loans to Bordeaux and Montpellier 
Having struggled to settle at Marseille, Cantona moved to Bordeaux on a six-month loan and then to Montpellier on a year-long loan. At Montpellier, he was involved in a fight with teammate Jean-Claude Lemoult and threw his boots in Lemoult's face. The incident led to six players demanding that Cantona be sacked, but with the support of teammates such as Laurent Blanc and Carlos Valderrama, the club retained his services, although they banned him from the ground for ten days. Cantona was instrumental as the team went on to win the French Cup and his form persuaded Marseille to take him back.

Return to Marseille, transfer to Nîmes 
Back at Marseille, Cantona initially played well under coach Gerard Gili and his successor Franz Beckenbauer. However, the Marseille chairman Bernard Tapie was not satisfied with the results, and replaced Beckenbauer with Raymond Goethals; Cantona was continually at odds with Goethals and Tapie and, despite helping the team win the French Division 1 title, he was transferred to Nîmes the following season, for a fee of 10 million francs, signing a three-year contract.

In December 1991, during a match for Nîmes, he threw the ball at the referee, having been angered by one of his decisions. He was summoned to a disciplinary hearing by the French Football Federation and was banned for one month. Cantona responded by walking up to members of the hearing committee in turn and calling each of them an "idiot". His ban was increased to two months, and Cantona subsequently announced his retirement from football on 16 December 1991. The France national team coach, Michel Platini, was a fan of Cantona, and persuaded him to make a comeback. On the advice of Gérard Houllier as well as his psychoanalyst, he moved to England to restart his career: "He [my psychoanalyst] advised me not to sign for Marseille and recommended that I should go to England."

Departure and move to England
On 6 November 1991, after Liverpool's 3–0 victory over Auxerre in a UEFA Cup second round, second leg tie at Anfield, Liverpool manager Graeme Souness was met by Frenchman Michel Platini at the end of the game, who told him that Cantona was available for sale to Liverpool. Souness thanked Platini, but declined the offer, citing dressing room harmony as his reason. After being turned down by Liverpool, Cantona was given a trial at Sheffield Wednesday when Wednesday manager Trevor Francis was approached by Platini and Francis' former agent, Dennis Roach. In a 2012 interview Francis explained that he had agreed to take Cantona on as a favour to Roach and Platini, who he knew from his time playing in Italy, and that it was intended as an opportunity for Cantona to put himself in the "shop window": Wednesday had only recently been promoted back to the top flight, with most of the squad still being on Second Division-level wages, and the club could not afford to sign him. Cantona spent two days with Wednesday, training and playing in an indoor tournament at Sheffield Arena.

Leeds United

1991–92 season
Cantona's arrival at Leeds United was announced in January 1992. Leeds would pay £100,000 to Nîmes to take him on loan until 15 April, after which they would have to pay another £900,000 to sign him permanently. Cantona made his debut for Leeds in a 2–0 loss at Oldham Athletic on 8 February 1992. At Leeds, he was part of the team that won the final Football League First Division title before it was replaced by the Premier League as the top division in English football. He made 15 appearances, and despite only scoring three goals, he was instrumental in their title success, primarily with assists for leading goalscorer Lee Chapman. Cantona scored his first goal for Leeds in a 2–0 win at home to Luton Town on 29 February, and set up the other goal for Chapman. Having played little football in the six weeks before signing for Leeds, Cantona struggled to find a place in an established line-up, with manager Howard Wilkinson preferring to put him on against tiring defences. Against Tottenham Hotspur at White Hart Lane on 7 March, Cantona came off the bench to set up a goal for Gary McAllister, securing a win that moved Leeds two points ahead of Manchester United, who had a game in hand, in the title race. Cantona was deployed as a part of a front three, along with Chapman and Rod Wallace, in a 5–1 thrashing of Wimbledon at Elland Road on 14 March, scoring Leeds' fourth goal of the game.

Leeds' title ambitions survived the difficult tests of Arsenal at Highbury (a 1–1 draw with Cantona denied a late winner by David Seaman) and West Ham (a 0–0 draw with Cantona being denied a first-half goal through a dubious offside decision); however, they lost 4–0 to Manchester City on 4 April at Maine Road, allowing Manchester United to take pole position in the title race again. Against Chelsea on 11 April, Cantona came on for Wallace with 20 minutes to go and Leeds leading 1–0; he then set up Chapman's 20th goal of the season before rounding off the scoring with a lob over Chelsea defender Paul Elliott. Two days later, Wilkinson announced that Leeds intended to complete Cantona's transfer from Nîmes for £900,000. Cantona was paid a generous £7,000 a week, a huge cost in an era without television or European football revenue. Starting with that Chelsea match, Leeds went unbeaten in their final five games, securing the league title on the penultimate weekend with a 3–2 win over Sheffield United after Manchester United had lost to Liverpool.

1992–93 season
In the 1992 FA Charity Shield that August, with Leeds missing several key players, Cantona scored a hat-trick in a 4–3 victory over Liverpool, the first hat-trick in the Charity Shield since Tommy Taylor in 1957. Cantona's hat-trick places him among the small group of players to have scored three or more goals in games at Wembley Stadium. Leeds started their title defence with a 2–1 win over Wimbledon on 15 August; Cantona started alongside Chapman up front, but had a quiet game, although he did pick up his first yellow card in English football, after 17 games. After Cantona scored his first league goal of the season in a 4–1 defeat at Middlesbrough, and followed it up with another hat-trick, the first in the newly created Premier League in a 5–0 win over Tottenham on 25 August. Cantona then flew to Paris to join the France national team for a friendly against Brazil on the very same day, due to newly installed manager Gérard Houllier's desire to have the whole squad present for his first match.

Leeds slipped towards mid-table with a pair of 2–2 draws despite excellent performances by Cantona, drawing two excellent saves from a young David James against fellow title challengers Liverpool on 29 August and scoring a brace against Oldham three days later. Leeds then fell 2–0 to Manchester United at Old Trafford on 6 September, with Cantona coming off the bench and nearly scoring with a bicycle kick. Leeds' first foray into the European Cup since 1974–75 started poorly with a 3–0 defeat at Stuttgart on 16 September; Cantona, struggling with a hamstring injury, had a pass intercepted that led to Stuttgart's opening goal, exacerbating a growing rift with manager Wilkinson. Cantona missed the next two games, a 1–1 draw at Southampton and a 4–1 win over Scunthorpe United in the League Cup, through injury but returned immediately to help Leeds win their first league game in six, a 2–0 victory over Everton on 26 September.

Four days later, Leeds faced Stuttgart in the return leg of the European Cup. Dubbed the 'Mission Impossible', Cantona and Gordon Strachan combined to set up Gary Speed, who scored with a left-footed volley. Andreas Buck equalised for Stuttgart in the 34th minute, the away goal meaning that Leeds needed another four to progress. McAllister scored a penalty just before half-time to make it 2–1 to Leeds before Cantona's looping shot in the 66th minute was deflected into his own net by Günther Schäfer. Chapman's header at the near post made it 4–1 in the 78th minute but Stuttgart remained firm and denied Leeds the decisive fifth goal. However, Leeds received a stroke of luck when it emerged after the match that Stuttgart's coach, Christoph Daum, had fielded four 'foreign' players, one more than allowed. Leeds were awarded a 3–0 victory by UEFA, and a play-off match was ordered at the neutral Camp Nou in Barcelona on 9 October.

An exhausted Leeds then stumbled to a 4–2 defeat at Ipswich Town, with Cantona's form dipping through fatigue and injury. He had a poor game as Leeds won the play-off against Stuttgart 2–1. A return to national duty then saw Cantona and Jean-Pierre Papin score in a 2–0 victory over Austria. He brought his revived form back to England, helping in a 3–1 victory against Sheffield United in October. This game would, however, be Cantona's last win while with Leeds.

Leeds were drawn against Rangers in the European Cup, a tie billed as 'The Battle of Britain' by the press. Despite McAllister's first-minute goal, Cantona and Leeds struggled and fell 2–1 amid a hostile Ibrox crowd. Cantona walked straight to the dressing room after being substituted which was interpreted by Wilkinson as disrespectful to the other players. Leeds also lost the return leg 2–1, Rangers scoring through Mark Hateley and Ally McCoist, before Cantona scored a late consolation goal. In between the two games, Cantona was an unused substitute when Leeds travelled to Queens Park Rangers as Wilkinson, favouring a more direct approach, found no room for him. Leeds lost 2–1, with Cantona leaving for France after being granted leave on the morning of the match. Wallace was preferred to start over Cantona in a fighting 2–2 draw at home to Coventry City. Managing just one win in four, Leeds' title defence had imploded in October, just as Arsenal's had in the previous season.

Cantona did however start in the 4–0 defeat at Manchester City on 7 November, but put in a hapless performance along with the rest of the team. Cantona was then guilty of "two dreadful misses" as Watford knocked them out of the League Cup on 10 November. Despite suffering along with his team, Wilkinson, rather than Cantona, was held responsible, after having to reinvigorate a side with a number of ageing stars. Despite Cantona scoring (with his shoulder) for France against Finland four days later, Wilkinson kept him out of the team, citing an unconvincing excuse of a "groin strain", as Leeds pulled off an improbable but resounding 3–0 win over Arsenal, ending the Gunners' six-game winning run. Furious at being dropped, Cantona refused to report for training and faxed a transfer request to the club on 24 November, stating a preference to join Manchester United, Liverpool or Arsenal.

Manchester United

Transfer from Leeds United
The news of Cantona's impending transfer from Leeds to fierce rivals Manchester United was met with hostility from Leeds fans. The transfer was, however, seen as a good piece of business by most football pundits, removing a turbulent player from the team.

Cantona left Leeds for Manchester United for £1 million on 26 November 1992. Leeds chairman Bill Fotherby had telephoned Manchester United chairman Martin Edwards to enquire about the availability of Denis Irwin. Edwards was in a meeting with manager Alex Ferguson at the time, and both agreed that Irwin was not for sale. Ferguson had identified that his team was in need of a striker, having recently made unsuccessful bids for David Hirst, Matt Le Tissier and Brian Deane, and instructed his chairman to ask whether Cantona was for sale. Fotherby had to consult with Wilkinson, but within a few days the deal was complete.

1992–93 season

Cantona had arrived too late to register to play in United's 1–0 win at Arsenal on 28 November, but was in the crowd at Highbury as his new team secured a vital win. He made his first appearance for the club on 1 December 1992 in a friendly match against Benfica in Lisbon to mark Eusébio's 50th birthday, wearing the number 10 shirt. He made his competitive debut as a second-half substitute against Manchester City at Old Trafford on 6 December. United won 2–1, though Cantona made little impact that day.

United's season had been disappointing up to Cantona's signing. They were falling behind the likes of big-spending Aston Villa and Blackburn Rovers in the race for the first Premier League title, as well as surprise challengers including Norwich City and Queens Park Rangers. Goalscoring had been a problem since the halfway point of the previous season – when it had cost them the league title as they suffered defeats or were held to draws at the hands of teams they had been expected to beat. Ferguson had first tried to sign Alan Shearer from Southampton during the 1992 close season, but lost out to Blackburn Rovers. He then spent £1 million on Dion Dublin, who suffered a broken leg a few games into the season and was out of action for six months. A £3 million bid for Sheffield Wednesday striker David Hirst was turned down, and by 7 November, United were eighth in the Premier League.

Cantona quickly settled into the team, slotting in alongside Mark Hughes, while Brian McClair was switched to midfield. Cantona contributed greatly to a quick upturn in the team's fortunes, not only scoring goals but also creating chances for the other players. His first United goal came in a 1–1 draw against Chelsea at Stamford Bridge on 19 December 1992, and his second came on Boxing Day in a 3–3 draw against Sheffield Wednesday at Hillsborough, where they claimed a point after being 3–0 down by the hour mark. However, controversy was never far away, and on his return to Elland Road to play Leeds a few weeks later, he spat at a fan and was fined £1,000 by The Football Association. United only lost twice in the league after Cantona's arrival, and finished the season 10 points clear at the top of the table, finishing as champions for the first time in 26 years, and making Cantona the first player to win consecutive English top division titles with different clubs. He had won a domestic league title with different clubs for three successive seasons, having helped Marseille win the French league title in 1991.

1993–94 season

United retained the Premier League, and Cantona's two penalties helped them to a 4–0 win over Chelsea in the 1994 FA Cup Final. He also collected a runners-up medal in the Football League Cup, which the team lost 3–1 to Aston Villa. He was also voted PFA Player of the Year for that season, and finished as United's top scorer with 25 goals in all competitions. However, the season was not without its moments of controversy; Cantona was sent off as the team exited the Champions League against Galatasaray, and he was also dismissed in successive league games in March 1994, firstly against Swindon Town and then against Arsenal. The two successive red cards saw Cantona banned for five matches, including an FA Cup semi-final clash with Oldham Athletic, which United drew 1–1. Cantona was available for the replay and helped them win 4–1.

1993–94 was the first season of squad numbers in the Premier League. Cantona was issued with the number 7 shirt, a squad number he kept for the rest of his United career, and which already had iconic status, having previously been worn by club legends including George Best and Bryan Robson. However, squad numbers were not set for the Champions League matches and Cantona wore the number 9 shirt in the four fixtures home and away against Kispest Honvéd and Galatasaray. On 19 December 1993, he scored two against Aston Villa (the previous season's runners-up) in a 3–1 victory that put United 13 points clear at the top of the league. They extended their lead to 16 points soon after, and eventually finished eight points ahead of runners-up Blackburn. Cantona was United's top scorer with 26 goals in all competitions.

1994–95 season, 'kung-fu' incident and ban from football
In the 1994–95 season, United looked to win a third successive league title, and for the first half of the season things went smoothly enough for player and club. The season began with a 2–0 Wembley win over Blackburn in the Charity Shield, in which Cantona scored a penalty. Cantona frequently scored for Manchester United, who put intense pressure on a Blackburn side that led the table for much of the season, particularly with a 4–2 win at Ewood Park in late October, in which Cantona was on the scoresheet. He was also on the scoresheet the following month in a memorable 5–0 derby win over Manchester City, and on 22 January he scored the winning goal in a 1–0 home win over Blackburn that made the title race even tighter and brought Cantona's tally of league goals for that season to 12. He had also scored a further goal in an FA Cup third round win at Sheffield United, and a second double was possible. The arrival of striker Andy Cole from Newcastle United on 10 January further boosted these hopes, even though Cole was cup-tied for FA Cup fixtures.

On 25 January 1995, he was involved in an incident that attracted headlines and controversy worldwide. In an away match against Crystal Palace, Cantona was sent off by the referee for kicking Palace defender Richard Shaw after Shaw had frustrated Cantona throughout the game by closely marking him. As he was walking towards the tunnel, Cantona launched a 'kung-fu' style kick into the crowd, directed at Palace supporter Matthew Simmons, who had run down 11 rows of stairs to confront and shout abuse at Cantona. Simmons was alleged to have used the words "Fuck off back to France, you French bastard". Cantona followed the kick with a series of punches. A lengthy ban from the game was regarded as inevitable, with some critics calling for Cantona to be deported and never allowed to play football in England again, while others called for him to be banned from football for life.

As well as disciplinary action from his club and The FA, Cantona was also faced with a criminal charge of assault, which he admitted to on 23 March, resulting in a two-week prison sentence, although he was freed on bail pending an appeal. This was overturned in the appeal court a week later and instead he was sentenced to 120 hours of community service, which was spent coaching children at United's training ground. At a press conference called later, Cantona said, in a slow and deliberate manner:

Cantona then got up from his seat and abruptly left, leaving behind him a packed media room surprised and baffled – some roared with laughter – with those in the room trying to decipher his cryptic words. In accordance with The FA's wishes, United's initial action was to fine Cantona £20,000 for the assault and to confirm that he would not play for the first team for the rest of the season, although United were still in the hunt for a second double. He was also stripped of the captaincy of the France national team by coach Aimé Jacquet. The FA then increased the ban to eight months (up to and including 30 September 1995) and fined him a further £10,000. The FA Chief Executive Graham Kelly described his attack as "a stain on our game" that brought shame on football. FIFA then confirmed the suspension as worldwide, meaning that Cantona could not escape the ban by being transferred or loaned to a foreign club. Cantona never played for the France national team again. His club eventually lost the Premier League title to Blackburn.

There had been media speculation that Cantona would leave United to play for a foreign club when his suspension finished, and many observers felt that he would not be able to cope with the inevitable goading from rival players and supporters, but Ferguson persuaded him to stay in Manchester, despite interest from Italian club Inter Milan (who had managed to lure his teammate Paul Ince to Italy that year).

Even after signing his new contract, Cantona was frustrated by the terms of his ban (which did not even allow him to play in friendly matches behind closed doors), and on 8 August, he handed in a request for his contract to be terminated, as he no longer wanted to play football in England. This came after United had been censured by the FA for fielding Cantona in a match against another club at the club's training ground, which was defined as a friendly match despite the club organising the match as being within the context of training – as his suspension allowed him to play in this type of match only. The request was turned down and two days later, following a meeting in Paris with Ferguson, he declared that he would remain at the club. In 2011, Cantona said that the attack on Simmons was "a great feeling" and a memory he is happy for fans to treasure, but "... it was a mistake". In 2002, the notoriety of the Kung fu kick saw it ranked number 12 on Channel 4's poll of the 100 Greatest Sporting Moments.

1995–96 season

In his comeback game against arch rivals Liverpool on 1 October 1995, Cantona set up a goal for Nicky Butt two minutes into the game, and then scored a penalty after Ryan Giggs was fouled to secure a point for United in a 2–2 home draw. However, eight months without competitive football had taken its toll and Cantona struggled for form prior to Christmas – by 24 December, the gap between United and league leaders Newcastle had increased to 10 points.

However, after defeat to Tottenham on New Year's Day, United went unbeaten for 12 consecutive league matches, including Cantona's first visit to Selhurst Park since he was banned, during which he scored twice in a 4–2 win over Wimbledon. Victory over Arsenal on 20 March, with Cantona scoring the only goal of the game with a 25-yard half-volley, saw United overtake Newcastle in the title race, where they would remain for the rest of the season. The goal came as part of a personal scoring run of six consecutive league matches for Cantona, four of which saw him score the game's only goal. He scored the fifth in a 5–0 win over Nottingham Forest on the penultimate day of the season, a result that meant that United realistically only needed to avoid defeat at Middlesbrough on the final day; they won 3–0 to secure their third league title in four years. Cantona finished the season as the club's top scorer with 14 goals from 30 league appearances.

Cantona's ban meant he was not eligible to appear in their League Cup or UEFA Cup campaigns, but he did score in four of United's six matches on the way to the 1996 FA Cup Final against Liverpool, their third in a row in the competition. In the absence of regular captain Steve Bruce due to injury, Cantona wore the armband for the final and took on the captain's responsibility by volleying in the only goal of the game from the edge of the 18-yard box in the 86th minute after Liverpool had failed to clear a corner. United's victory made them the first club to win the Double twice and Cantona the first FA Cup-winning captain from outside the British Isles.

1996–97 season

Cantona was named as United's captain for the 1996–97 season following the departure of Bruce to Birmingham City. United retained the league in the 1996–97 season; Cantona had won four league titles in five years with the team, and six in seven years including those won with Marseille and Leeds, the exception being the 1994–95 season which he had missed the second half of through suspension. Cantona's stand-out moment in his final season was a goal and memorable celebration against Sunderland in December 1996; after chipping Sunderland goalkeeper Lionel Pérez from just inside the penalty area, Cantona celebrated by standing still, emotionless, slowly turning around and raising his arms before embracing McClair, who had provided the assist.

At the end of the season he announced that he was retiring from football at the age of 30. His final competitive game came against West Ham on 11 May 1997, and his final appearance before retiring was five days later on 16 May in a testimonial for David Busst (whose career had been ended by an injury suffered against United the previous year) against Coventry City at Highfield Road. Cantona scored a total of 64 league goals for United, 13 in domestic cup competitions, and 5 in the Champions League, bringing his tally to 82 goals in less than five years.

After leaving
In 1998, the Football League, as part of its centenary season celebrations, included Cantona on its list of 100 League Legends. Cantona's achievements in the English League were further marked in 2002 when he was made an inaugural inductee of the English Football Hall of Fame. Later in 1998, Cantona organised a match of Manchester United players against other players from around the world in what was originally designed to be a memorial for the victims of the Munich Air Disaster in 1958 and their families, but which was merged with a testimonial for Cantona himself.

In his 1999 autobiography Managing My Life, Alex Ferguson claimed that Cantona had informed him of his decision to retire from playing within 24 hours of Manchester United's Champions League semi-final defeat to Borussia Dortmund, though the decision was not made public for almost a month afterwards. During that time, there had been speculation about his future at Manchester United, including talk of a move to Real Zaragoza of Spain. Returning to Britain in 2003 to pick up the Overseas Player of the Decade Award at the Premier League 10 Seasons Awards, Cantona said of his premature retirement, "When you quit football it is not easy, your life becomes difficult. I should know because sometimes I feel I quit too young. I loved the game but I no longer had the passion to go to bed early, not to go out with my friends, not to drink, and not to do a lot of other things, the things I like in life." In 2004, Cantona was quoted as saying, "I'm so proud the fans still sing my name, but I fear tomorrow they will stop. I fear it because I love it. And everything you love, you fear you will lose." 

He was interviewed in the "Number 7s" issue of Manchester United's official magazine, United, in August 2006, stating he would only return to United as 'Number 1' (meaning not return as assistant manager or coach) and would create a team like no other and play the way he thinks football should be played; however, Cantona opposes the ownership of Manchester United by the Glazer family, and has stated that he will not return to the club, even as a manager, while they are in charge.

In March 2014, Cantona was arrested and cautioned for an act of common assault on Regent's Park Road in Camden, North London. The victim did not require medical attention.

Cantona received the UEFA President's Award in August 2019. Dressed in a flat cap, he began by quoting William Shakespeare's King Lear – "As flies to wanton boys we are for the gods" – before referencing science, war and crime. Similar to the response to his "seagulls" press conference in 1995, the puzzled audience watched in silence.

International career
Cantona was given his full international debut against West Germany in August 1987 by national team manager Henri Michel. In September 1988, angered after being dropped from the national team, Cantona referred to Michel as a "bag of shit" in a post-match TV interview and was indefinitely banned from all international matches. However, Michel was sacked shortly after that having failed to qualify for the 1990 FIFA World Cup. The new coach was Michel Platini and one of his first acts was to recall Cantona. Platini stated that whilst he was coach, Cantona would be selected for France as long as he was playing competitive top-class football; it was Platini who had initiated Cantona's move to England to restart his career. France qualified for Euro 1992 held in Sweden, but failed to win a single game despite the striking partnership of Cantona and Jean-Pierre Papin. Platini resigned after the finals to be replaced by Gérard Houllier.

Under Houllier, France failed to qualify for the 1994 World Cup in the United States after losing the final game 2–1 at home to Bulgaria, when a draw would have sufficed. Houllier resigned and Aimé Jacquet took over. Jacquet began to rebuild the national team in preparation for Euro 96 and appointed Cantona as captain. Cantona remained captain until the Selhurst Park incident in January 1995. The suspension which resulted from this incident also prevented him from playing in international  to Zinedine Zidane, as Jacquet had revamped the squad with some new players. Cantona, Papin and David Ginola lost their places in the squad and were never selected for the French team again, thus missing Euro 96. Though there was media criticism about Cantona's omission, as he was playing his best football in the Premier League, Jacquet stated that the team had done well without Cantona, and that he wanted to keep faith with the players who had taken them so far. In a 2015 interview with French radio network France Info, Cantona stated that had he still been involved with the national side, he would have extended his career to feature in the 1998 World Cup, held in Cantona's home nation. Cantona still harbours resentment for the people at the head of his national team but also admiration for his adopted football country; at Euro 2004 and the 2006 World Cup, he supported England and not France.

Post-playing career

Acting career

Cantona focused his later career mostly as an actor in French cinema, having had his first role as a rugby player in Le bonheur est dans le pré, shot during his 1995 suspension from football. In the late 1990s, he accepted a role as a French ambassador in the English film Elizabeth (1998). In 2002, he directed a short film, Apporte-moi ton amour. He guest-starred as a mysterious barroom philosopher in independent British film Jack Says, released to DVD in September 2008. He co-starred as director Thierry Grimandi in French Film (2009), and is co-producer and a lead actor in Ken Loach's Palme D'or nominated film Looking for Eric (2009). He stars as The Corsican in the Danish western The Salvation, which premiered at the 2014 Cannes Film Festival on 17 May 2014.

In January 2020, Cantona played The King in the music video for Liam Gallagher's single "Once".

Work with Nike and other companies

Cantona has frequently appeared in commercials for the sportswear company Nike. In 1994, he was involved in a Nike advertising campaign which featured a black and white image of himself in front of the English flag, with the caption: "'66 was a great year for English football. Eric was born." In 1996, he was the central figure in a Nike commercial titled "Good vs Evil" in a gladiatorial game set in a Roman amphitheatre. Appearing alongside football players from around the world, including Ronaldo, Paolo Maldini, Luís Figo, Patrick Kluivert and Jorge Campos, they defend "the beautiful game" against a team of demonic warriors, which ends with Cantona receiving the ball from Ronaldo, pulling up his shirt collar as was his trademark, and delivering the final line, "Au Revoir", before striking the ball which punches right through the demon goalkeeper. Since his retirement from professional football in 1997, Cantona has continued to appear in Nike commercials, often in a non playing role. In 1997 he starred in Nike's “Park Life” commercial (set to the song "Parklife" by Blur) where a group of pub league players playing amateur football at Hackney Marshes in east London are suddenly joined by top Premier League footballers, including Cantona, Ian Wright, David Seaman and Robbie Fowler. In 2000, "Park Life" was ranked number 15 in Channel 4's poll of the 100 Greatest TV Ads.

In a global Nike advertising campaign in the run-up to the 2002 World Cup, Cantona starred as the organiser of "underground" games (branded by Nike as "Scorpion KO") in a commercial directed by Terry Gilliam, which takes place between football players such as Thierry Henry, Ronaldinho, Francesco Totti, Roberto Carlos and Hidetoshi Nakata. In a Nike campaign ahead of the 2006 World Cup, Cantona appeared as the lead spokesman for the Joga Bonito organization, an association attempting to eliminate acting and fake play from football. He also starred in a Eurostar commercial in 1996, and an Irish EuroMillions advertisement in 2004. In 2009, he featured in a British television advertisement for a new model of the Renault Laguna.

Beach soccer

Shortly after his departure from Manchester United in 1997, Cantona became captain of the France national beach soccer team, gaining an interest in the sport through his brother Joel who was already a part of the France national side travelling the world to play matches. Cantona continued his interest in beach soccer games in southern Asia and at the Inaugural Kronenbourg Beach Soccer Cup in 2002, in the city of Brighton, England.

As a recognisable figure, Cantona was key to beach soccer's growth during the sports early years, being a magnet for drawing in fans to beach soccer events, and also helping to promote the sport, saying in 2002, "Physically it is difficult, technically it is difficult, and tactically it's difficult too. We must work very hard, and train regularly together. Beach Soccer has got everything needed to be a great sport."

He found considerable success as he managed and played in the French team which won their first European title at the 2004 Euro Beach Soccer League and the inaugural FIFA Beach Soccer World Cup in 2005 in Rio de Janeiro, France's first and only World title to date. This was Cantona's final year as a player. However he continued to coach the France national team at the 2006 FIFA Beach Soccer World Cup, which finished in third place. In 2007 Cantona enjoyed another successful year as manager, taking France to fourth place in the World Cup and narrowly missing out on a second European title, finishing runners-up to Portugal after a 7–6 loss in the final of the 2007 Euro Beach Soccer League. The World Cup was held in France for the first time in 2008; however, Cantona was unable to make the top four after losing to Italy in the quarter finals.

After failing, as manager, to qualify France to the World Cup for the first time in 2009, Cantona's demise as head coach was sealed in 2010 as not only did France fail in qualification for the upcoming World Cup again, but Cantona also lead the national team to relegation from the top division of the Euro Beach Soccer League down to Division B. These series of disappointments lead to Cantona resigning as manager of France in 2011, after almost 15 years involved in the team. In 2019, the magazine France Football placed Cantona fourth in an article named "10 Legends of Beach Soccer".

Brief stint with New York Cosmos

New York Cosmos announced the Frenchman's return to football as their Director of Soccer on 18 January 2011. On arrival, Cantona described his role to the press as to help Cosmos "regain the number one position in the United States and then... to become one of the best clubs in the world over the coming years." Cantona was later fired by the club after a confrontation with a photographer, and in May 2015 he sued the Cosmos for nearly $1 million in back pay and a promised 4% equity share. Cosmos rejected his claims, insisting that his role as Director of Soccer was largely ceremonial, and that Cantona's true job was as "a promoter and brand ambassador". The two parties later agreed to dismiss the lawsuit, though terms of a settlement were not disclosed.

Style of play
Regarded as one of the best players of his generation, one of the greatest Premier League players of all time, and as one of France's and Manchester United's greatest players ever, Cantona is affectionately nicknamed by Manchester United fans as "King Eric". A large, physically strong, hard-working, and tenacious player, Cantona was a world–class forward, who combined technical skill and creativity with power and goalscoring ability. Despite his height and imposing physique, he was an elegant player on the ball, due to his long torso, which gave him a lower centre of gravity than most players of his stature, and who possessed strong technical skills and ball control, as well as an excellent first touch. Moreover, he was renowned for his vision, passing, intelligence, quick–thinking, and playmaking skills, in addition to his eye for goal and powerful and accurate striking ability, which often saw him score from spectacular strikes and volleys; as such, he often played in a free, creative role between the midfield and forward lines throughout his career, acting as a deep–lying forward behind the main striker, due to his tendency to drop deep into midfield to retrieve the ball and orchestrate attacking plays, as well as his ability both to score goals and provide assists for teammates. However, Cantona was also capable of playing as a centre-forward, due to his ability to hold-up the ball with his back to goal (although this was not his favoured position), as an out–and–out striker, as an attacking midfielder, or even as a central midfielder on occasion. He was also an accurate penalty and free kick taker. 

Due to his height, physique, positional sense, and heading accuracy, he was strong in the air; furthermore, he was also known for being both mentally and physically tough, and was highly regarded for his strong, commanding, and charismatic personality, as well as his leadership and bravery, which helped to alleviate pressure from his teammates. Indeed, Cantona was also known for iconically turning up his collar during matches; Wayne Barton notes that he first wore his collar up in a Manchester derby match on 7 November 1993, following United's elimination from Europe at the hands of Galatasary, commenting: "one wonders if, in his own superstitious way, this was Cantona’s way of calming that fire inside him after the trip to Turkey, a way to focus his thoughts on moving forward." When asked about the reason behind his famous on-field appearance, he commented: "I didn’t plan it. During one game it was cold and my collar just stayed up. We won, so it became a habit to play with my collar up." Cantona was a hard-working player, who also stood out for his defensive contribution off the ball, as well as his ability to start attacking plays after winning back possession; he also drew praise in the media for his discipline and dedication in training. Despite his talent and natural ability, however, he was also notorious for his aggression, confrontational behaviour, volatile temper, and lack of discipline on the pitch, as well as his tendency to commit hard challenges, which made him a highly controversial figure in world football. Moreover, he was known for being outspoken on a number of issues, and was even accused in media of what was perceived as being arrogant. When he was asked whether Zidane or Platini was the greatest French player of all time, for example, he said: "No, it is me." He also drew criticism from certain pundits for being inconsistent at times, and for his disappointing performances in European club competitions, as well as his lack of significant speed, which was particularly evident in his later career, as he lost some of his pace with age.

Political views
Cantona called for a social revolution against the banks and encouraged customers of the major retail banks to withdraw their money on 7 December 2010 in protest at the global financial crisis. This proposal then became the base for an online campaign calling for a bank run.

In January 2012, Cantona began trying to gather the 500 signatures from elected officials necessary for a bid for the French presidential election, in order to draw support for the homeless charity and campaign group Emmaus.

In June 2012, he signed a petition for the release of Palestinian footballer Mahmoud Sarsak: imprisoned without conviction by Israel in July 2009 and finally released on 10 July 2012.

Personal life
Cantona married Isabelle Ferrer in 1987, and they had two children together before divorcing in 2003. He married actress Rachida Brakni in 2007; they also have two children together.

Cantona's brother, Joël, is also a former footballer who retired at a young age and went into acting. His cousin, Sacha Opinel, is also a footballer and his nephew, Martin Cantona, is goalkeeper for a Montreal university team.

Career statistics

Club

International

Scores and results list France's goal tally first, score column indicates score after each Cantona goal.

Honours
Auxerre
Coppa delle Alpi: 1986–87

Marseille
Division 1: 1988–89, 1990–91

Montpellier
Coupe de France: 1989–90

Leeds United
Football League First Division: 1991–92
FA Charity Shield: 1992

Manchester United
Premier League: 1992–93, 1993–94, 1995–96, 1996–97
FA Cup: 1993–94, 1995–96
FA Charity Shield: 1993, 1994, 1996

France U21
UEFA European Under-21 Championship: 1988

France Beach
Euro Beach Soccer League: 2004
FIFA Beach Soccer World Cup: 2005

Individual
Division 1 Rookie of the Year: 1987
Ballon d'Or – Third Place: 1993
Most assists in the Premier League: 1992–93, 1996–97
BBC Sport Goal of the Month: February 1994, December 1996
PFA Premier League Team of the Year: 1993–94
PFA Players' Player of the Year: 1993–94
FWA Footballer of the Year: 1995–96
Premier League Player of the Month: March 1996
Sir Matt Busby Player of the Year: 1993–94, 1995–96
Onze d'Or: 1996
ESM Team of the Year: 1995–96
Premier League 10 Seasons Awards (1992–93 to 2001–02)
Overseas and Overall Team of the Decade
Overseas Player of the Decade
Inducted into the inaugural English Football Hall of Fame: 2002
UEFA Golden Jubilee Poll: No. 42
FIFA 100 Greatest Living Footballers: 2004
PFA Team of the Century (1907–2007):
Football League 100 Legends
Golden Foot Legends Award: 2012
French Player of the Century: No.10
UEFA President's Award: 2019
Premier League Hall of Fame: 2021

Filmography

Film

Documentaries
 Les rebelles du foot (2012)
 Looking for Istanbul (2012)
 Foot et immigration, 100 ans d'histoire commune (2014)
 Looking for Rio (2014)
 Looking for Athènes (2013)
 The Stone Roses: Made of Stone (2013) 
 Manchester United: The Official History 1878–2002 (2002)

Stage
Face au paradis (English title: Faced with Paradise) – 2010 (stage production directed by Rachida Brakni)

Bibliography

References

External links

 
 
 
 
 Profile at ManUtd.com
 Profile  at premierleague.com
 
 

1966 births
20th-century French male actors
21st-century French male actors
AJ Auxerre players
Association football forwards
Beach soccer coaches
English Football Hall of Fame inductees
English Football League players
Expatriate footballers in England
FC Girondins de Bordeaux players
FC Martigues players
FIFA 100
Footballers from Marseille
France international footballers
France youth international footballers
France under-21 international footballers
French beach soccer players
French emigrants to England
French expatriate footballers
French expatriate sportspeople in England
French expatriate sportspeople in the United States
French footballers
French male film actors
French male stage actors
French male television actors
French people of Catalan descent
French sportspeople of Italian descent
French people of Sardinian descent
French people of Spanish descent
Leeds United F.C. players
Ligue 1 players
Ligue 2 players
Living people
Manchester United F.C. players
Montpellier HSC players
Nîmes Olympique players
Olympique de Marseille players
People convicted of assault
Premier League Hall of Fame inductees
Premier League players
UEFA Euro 1992 players
FA Cup Final players
French male criminals
20th-century French criminals
Sportspeople convicted of crimes